Chuanfang Lisu and Dai Ethnic Township is an ethnic township in  County, Yunnan, China.

Administrative division 
As of 2016, the township is divided into four villages: 
 Chuanfang
 Huarong
 Huiwo
 Jiaju

History 
It used to be in the territory of the Yuan dynasty (1271–1368).

In 1909, Huaping County was set up and this region was county seat.

During the Republic of China, it belonged to Yulu Township.

After the establishment of the Communist State, in 1950, it belonged to the 5th District. In 1961, its name was changed to Huarong People's Commune and then merged into the Yongxing District. The Chuanfang Lisu and Dai Ethnic Township was established in 1988.

Geography 
The township lies at the northeastern of Huaping County, bordering Yongxing Lisu Ethnic Township and Zhongxin Town to the west, the town of Xingquan to the south, and Yanbian County to the east and northeast.

The Wumu River flows through the township.

Climate 

Economy 
The economy is supported primarily by farming, animal husbandry and mineral resources. The main crops are rice, wheat and corn. Economic crops are mainly zanthoxylum, tea, walnut, loquat, persimmon, and citrus. The region also has an abundance of coal, granite and limestone.

Demographics 

As of 2017, the National Bureau of Statistics of China estimates the township's population now to be 9,685.

References

Bibliography 

Divisions of Huaping County